Fizadan (also Romanized as Fīzādān; also known as Fāzādān, Pazādān, and Pīzādān) is a village in Keraj Rural District, in the Central District of Isfahan County, Isfahan Province, Iran. At the 2006 census, its population was 792, in 227 families.

References 

Populated places in Isfahan County